The 1986 Eastern Michigan Hurons football team represented Eastern Michigan University in the 1986 NCAA Division I-A football season. In their fourth season under head coach Jim Harkema, the Hurons compiled a 6–5 record (4–4 against conference opponents), finished in a tie for fifth place in the Mid-American Conference, and were outscored by their opponents, 228 to 222. The team's statistical leaders included Ron Adams with 1,995 passing yards, Gary Patton with 1,058 rushing yards, and Don Vesling with 653 receiving yards.

Schedule

References

Eastern Michigan
Eastern Michigan Eagles football seasons
Eastern Michigan Hurons football